University of Brno may refer to:

 Masaryk University
 Mendel University 
 Brno University of Technology
 University of Veterinary and Pharmaceutical Sciences, Brno
 Janáček Academy of Music and Performing Arts